Tiling puzzles are puzzles involving two-dimensional packing problems in which a number of flat shapes have to be assembled into a larger given shape without overlaps (and often without gaps).  Some tiling puzzles ask you to dissect a given shape first and then rearrange the pieces into another shape.  Other tiling puzzles ask you to dissect a given shape while fulfilling certain conditions.  The two latter types of tiling puzzles are also called dissection puzzles. 

Tiling puzzles may be made from wood, metal, cardboard, plastic or any other sheet-material. Many tiling puzzles are now available as computer games.

Tiling puzzles have a long history. Some of the oldest and most famous are jigsaw puzzles and the tangram puzzle.

Other examples of tiling puzzles include:
 Conway puzzle
 Domino tiling, of which the mutilated chessboard problem is one example
 Eternity puzzle
 Geometric magic square
 Puzz-3D
 Squaring the square
 Tantrix
 T puzzle

Many three-dimensional mechanical puzzles can be regarded as three-dimensional tiling puzzles.

See also
Dissection puzzle
Polyforms
Sliding puzzle
Tessellation
Wang tile

Tessellation